Inbuan is a form of wrestling native to the people of Mizoram in India. Inbuan is said to have originated in the village of Dungtlang in 1750. It was recognized as a sport after the Mizo people migrated from Burma to the Lushai Hills.

History
It is thought to have originated in 1750 at the village of Dungtlang in Mizoram, India. It was recognized as a sport after the Mizo people migrated from Burma to the Lushai Hills. From 1871 to 1940, boys would gather after evening meal in village dormitory and played Inbuan almost every night. It was also played ceremonially between villages when a sick or dead person's body is carried from one village to another, which was called Hlang inchuh or Mizawn inchuh.

Characteristics
Inbuan involves very strict rules prohibiting kicking, stepping out of the circle and even bending of the knees. The contest is held in a circle 15–16 feet in diameter on carpet or grass. The objective is to lift one's opponent off his feet while strictly adhering to the rules. The matches are held in three rounds each of 30–60 seconds of duration, the match generally continues till a wrestler either breaks a rule or is lifted off his feet.

Another feature of this form of wrestling is the catch-hold belt worn by the wrestlers around the waist. It has to remain tight all through the match.

See also
 Akhara
 Boli Khela
 Gatta Gusthi
 Malakhra
 Malla-yuddha
 Mukna
 Naban
 Pehlwani
 Vajra-mushti

References

External links
Inbuan Traditional Sports in India

Indian martial arts
Folk wrestling styles
Combat sports
Individual sports